Dilip Ruwan Herath Mudiyanselage (born 4 July 1991) is a sprinter from Sri Lanka who specialises in the 400 m distance. He won silver medals in the 4 × 400 m relay at the 2016 South Asian Games and 2017 Asian Championships; his team placed fourth at the 2018 Asian Games. Individually he won a bronze medal at the 2016 South Asian Games.

References

Sri Lankan male sprinters
1991 births
Living people
South Asian Games silver medalists for Sri Lanka
South Asian Games bronze medalists for Sri Lanka
South Asian Games medalists in athletics